The Central Investigation Bureau (CIB) is the national investigation agency of Nepal which is run under Nepal Police. It is sometimes referred as Central Investigation Bureau of Nepal Police. The Central Investigation Bureau (CIB) of Nepal Police aims to sweep away organised crime from the country within a few years. It runs under Nepal Government.

See also
Crime in Nepal
Directorate of Military Intelligence, Nepal
National Investigation Department of Nepal

References